The Costa Rican Confederation of Workers (CTRN) Costa Rican trade union center. It was formed in 1991 by the merger of three union centres.

The CTRN is affiliated with the International Trade Union Confederation.

See also

 Trade unions in Costa Rica

References

External links
www.rerumnovarum.or.cr

Trade unions in Costa Rica
International Trade Union Confederation
Trade unions established in 1991
1991 establishments in Costa Rica